The 2022 All Japan High School Soccer Tournament (第101回全国高等学校サッカー選手権大会; All Japan JFA 101st High School Soccer Tournament) marked the 101st edition of the referred annually contested cup for High Schools over Japan, won by Okayama Gakugeikan after a 3–1 win over Higashiyama on the Final, which was the first high school from Okayama to ever win the competition. 

As usual, the tournament was contested by all 48 winning schools of their respective prefectural qualifications. Tokyo's qualification tournament was the only one out of the 47 to qualify two high school teams for the tournament. The metropolitan area was also given the rights to host the final, scheduled to be played at the Japan National Stadium, in Shinjuku. Aomori Yamada were the defending champions, winning the previous championship by 4–0 against Ozu, which rewarded a scoreful and eventful campaign throughout the 2021 tournament.

As usual, from the first round to the quarterfinals, the matches had a duration of 80 minutes, split into two halves of 40 minutes each. The semi-finals and the final had matches lasting 90 minutes, the standard match length on professional football. During the tournament, if a match should be tied, it would directly require penalty shoot-outs, except for the final, where overtime would be played if the match were tied for 90 minutes. All the matches were digitally broadcast on TVer and SPORTS BULL. In Japan, the competition has this year, in total, 43 official broadcasters. The semi-finals and the final were broadcast on NHK.

Calendar
The tournament took place in a 13-day span, with the tournament split into a total of 6 stages. The draw was conducted on 21 November 2022 by the JFA, deciding the tournament schedule and the match pairings.

Venues
The tournament was held in 4 prefectures and 9 stadiums. In Kanagawa, Chiba, and Saitama prefectures, two venues are located in each, while three are located in Tokyo. The venues are:

Tokyo – Japan National Stadium, Komazawa Olympic Park Stadium and Ajinomoto Field Nishigaoka
Kanagawa – Kawasaki Todoroki Stadium and NHK Spring Mitsuzawa Football Stadium
Saitama – Urawa Komaba Stadium and NACK5 Stadium Omiya
Chiba – Kashiwanoha Stadium and ZA Oripri Stadium

Participating clubs

Schedule
The schedule was announced on 21 November 2022, after the draw was conducted by the JFA, following the completion of the competition's prefectural qualifications.

First round

Second round

Third round

Quarter-finals

Semi-finals

Final

Top scorers
.

Selected best players
The following 36 players featured in the Tournament's Best Players Squad:

Participating schools' players to join J.League clubs
.All the following players will sign for J.League clubs for the 2023 season, after graduating from a participating school in this year's high school tournament.

References

External links
Official Schedule (JFA)
About the Tournament (JFA)

Football competitions in Japan
Youth football competitions
2022 in Japanese football